An optical train, also called an optical assembly, is an arrangement of optical components (e.g. lenses, mirrors, prisms) to guide a line of sight and/or a laser beam. For example, the position and angle of lenses may be adjusted to guide a laser through the path required. Optical instruments like microscopes, telescopes, and DSLRs all have optical trains that guide the incoming light towards a detector or the eye of an observer. The optical train of a telescope is commonly called an optical tube assembly (OTA).

See also
 Optical path

Optical devices